The trobar ric, or rich form of poetry, was a trobadour style.

It was distinguished by its verbal gymnastics; its best exponent was Arnaut Daniel. Despite the fact that it outlasted trobar clus it always played a secondary role to trobar leu.

See also
Trobar leu
Trobar clus

External links
 Cunnan wiki source (GFDL) 

Occitan literature
Western medieval lyric forms